Dallas Thornton (born September 1, 1946) is an American former basketball player.

Biography
Thornton was born in Louisville, Kentucky and played basketball at Male High School there.

Thornton played college basketball at Kentucky Wesleyan College.

Thornton was selected in the 1968 NBA draft in the fourth round by the Baltimore Bullets and was selected in the 1968 ABA draft by the Miami Floridians.   Thornton opted to sign with the Floridians and played for the team through two seasons, averaging 6.6 points per game in the 1968–69 season and 8.8 points per game in 1969–70.

Thornton then played for the Harlem Globetrotters and appeared in the 1981 movie The Harlem Globetrotters on Gilligan's Island.

References

1946 births
Living people
American men's basketball players
Baltimore Bullets (1963–1973) draft picks
Harlem Globetrotters players
Kentucky Wesleyan Panthers men's basketball players
Louisville Male High School alumni
Miami Floridians draft picks
Miami Floridians players
Small forwards
Basketball players from Louisville, Kentucky